Gilbert V de Umfraville (July 1390 – 22 March 1421), popularly styled the "Earl of Kyme", was an English noble who took part in the Hundred Years War. He was killed during the Battle of Baugé in 1421 fighting a Franco-Scots army.

Life
Gilbert was born at the end of July 1390, the only son of Thomas II de Umfraville of Harbottle and Agnes Grey. He succeeded his father on 12 February 1391, as a minor of only twenty-eight weeks old. He married Anne, daughter of Ralph Neville, 1st Earl of Westmorland, and his wife Margaret, daughter of Hugh Stafford, 2nd Earl of Stafford in 1413. He died fighting the French at the Battle of Baugé on 22 March 1421. He did not have any issue and the family estates were partitioned between his five sisters and their husbands. His uncle Robert de Umfraville, inherited the Redesdale and Kyme estates.

See also 

 Umfraville

Notes

References
Wagner, John A. Encyclopedia of the Hundred Years War. Westport CT: Greenwood Press, 2006. .

1390 births
1421 deaths
14th-century English nobility
15th-century English nobility
People of the Hundred Years' War
Gilbert 05